Dionýz Ilkovič (18 January 1907 – 3 August 1980) was a Czechoslovak physicist and physical chemist of Rusyn ethnicity. Along with Nobel laureate Jaroslav Heyrovský, he helped to establish theoretical basis of polarography. In this field, he is the author of an important result, the Ilkovic's equation. He  was also one of the leading figures in modern university-level physics education in Slovakia.

References

{https://www.martinus.sk/?uItem=214195t}

1907 births
1980 deaths
Charles University alumni
Academic staff of the Slovak University of Technology in Bratislava
Czechoslovak physicists